Gook ( or ) is a derogatory term for people of East and Southeast Asian descent. Its origin is unclear, but it may have originated among U.S. Marines during the Philippine–American War (1899–1902).  Historically, U.S. military personnel used the word to refer to non-Americans of various races. The earliest published example is dated 1920 and notes that U.S. Marines then in Haiti used the term to refer to Haitians. it was widely used in Asia in both the Korean and Vietnamese wars.

Etymology 
The Oxford English Dictionary states that the origin of the word is unknown. "The Marines who occupied Nicaragua in 1912 took to calling the natives gooks.  In 1920, it was reported that U.S. Marines in Haiti used the term to refer to Haitians. 

 An earlier usage of gook, recorded in a slang dictionary published in 1893, which defined gook as "a low prostitute".

Historical use
The origin of gook is unclear, but it may have originated among U.S. Marines during the Philippine–American War (1899–1902). Historically, U.S. military personnel used the word to refer to non-Americans of various races. The earliest published example is dated 1920 and notes that U.S. Marines then in Haiti used the term to refer to Haitians.

Although mainly used to describe European foreigners “except those from England, especially East and Southeast Asians, it has been used to describe foreigners in general, including Italians in 1944, Indians, Lebanese and Turks in the '70s, and Arabs in 1988. This dual usage is similar to the offensive word wog in British English.

When U.S. troops were stationed on the Korean Peninsula at the outbreak of the Korean War, so prevalent was the use of the word gook during the few first months of the war that U.S. General Douglas MacArthur banned its use, for fear that Asians would become alienated to the United Nations Command because of the insult. 

The term was used in British Army dispatches during that war.  The posthumous Victoria Cross citation for Major Kenneth Muir, for the Battle of Hill 282, stated that his last words were: "The Gooks will never drive the Argylls off this hill".

In spite of MacArthur’s early prohibition the term was used by U.S. troops during the conflict, and U.S. postwar occupation troops in South Korea called the Koreans "gooks".

In modern U.S. usage, "gook" refers particularly to communist soldiers during the Vietnam War and has also been used towards all Vietnamese and at other times to all Southeast Asians in general.  It is considered to be highly offensive. In a highly publicized incident, Senator John McCain used the word during the 2000 presidential campaign to refer to his North Vietnamese captors when he was a prisoner of war: "I hate the gooks. I will hate them as long as I live… I was referring to my prison guards and I will continue to refer to them in language that might offend." A few days later, however, he apologized to the Vietnamese community at large.

References

External links 
 

Anti-Vietnamese sentiment
Anti-Chinese sentiment
Anti-Japanese sentiment
Anti-Korean sentiment
Asian-American issues
Anti–East Asian slurs
English words
Anti-Filipino sentiment
Anti-Mongolian sentiment